R. C. Bannon (born Daniel Shipley; May 2, 1945) is an American country music singer. Active since 1977, Bannon has recorded for the Columbia and RCA labels. He was also married to singer Louise Mandrell from 1979 to 1991, and charted six duets with her in addition to 12 singles of his own. His highest-charting single was his 1979 cover of the Peaches & Herb hit "Reunited," recorded as a duet with Mandrell, that reached number 13 on the country music charts in 1979; his most successful solo single is "Winners and Losers" at number 26. In addition to recording as a solo artist and with Mandrell, Bannon co-wrote songs for Ronnie Milsap, Bobby G. Rice, Barbara Mandrell and Steve Azar.

Biography
Bannon was born in Dallas, Texas. There, he sang in his family's church choir as a child, later taking interest in rock music as well as gospel. He also played guitar in several rock bands during the late 1950s and into the 1960s.

In the mid-1960s, Bannnon's family moved to Seattle, Washington, where he performed in nightclubs and sang on a local television program every morning, in addition to working as a disc jockey, for KUUU, an oldies format station. It was during his tenure as a disc jockey that he took the professional name R.C. Bannon. After opening for Marty Robbins, Robbins encouraged him to move to Nashville; Bannon declined at first, and attempted to sign to various labels near California. He briefly signed a contract with Capitol Records, but did not release anything for that label.

Musical career
Finally, in 1976, Bannon moved to Nashville. There, he worked at a discotheque, and later began meeting other singers and songwriters, including one named Harlan Sanders. After signing to a songwriting contract, he had his songs recorded by Robbins, as well as singles released by Bobby G. Rice ("The Softest Touch in Town") and Ronnie Milsap (the Number One "Only One Love in My Life"). In 1977, he signed to Columbia Records, who released his debut album, R.C. Bannon Arrives. Three of the album's cuts made the Hot Country Songs charts, including the No. 33 "It Doesn't Matter Anymore." The album included several songs that Bannon co-wrote, most in collaboration with John Bettis. By 1979, he married Louise Mandrell, with whom he would chart six duets, including the No. 13 "Reunited," his highest-charting single. The two released five duets albums between 1979 and 1982. He and Bettis also co-wrote "One of a Kind Pair of Fools" for Louise's sister, Barbara Mandrell. Bannon continued to perform as a musician in Mandrell's show, even after divorcing her in 1991. In the 2000s, Bannon co-wrote Steve Azar's "I Don't Have to Be Me ('Til Monday)." He subsequently married Natalie McGill.

Discography

Albums

Singles

Duets with Louise Mandrell

Other charted songs

Notes

References

1945 births
Living people
American country singer-songwriters
American male singer-songwriters
Columbia Records artists
Musicians from Dallas
RCA Records artists
Singer-songwriters from Texas
Country musicians from Texas